Prudnik Castle was a gothic castle located in Prudnik, Opole Voivodeship, within the Upper Silesia region of Poland.

History 

Prudnik Castle was located in the defensive bend of the Prudnik river. It was built in 1255. It was founded a Czech knight Wok of Rosenberg.

The castle was destroyed in 1428 by the Hussites. After the end of the first Silesian War, Frederick the Great rebuilt the castle.

A fire on 27 August 1806 burnt the entire castle except of one tower called "Wok's Tower", which is now the only remnant of the castle.

References

External links 

Buildings and structures completed in 1255
Castles in Opole Voivodeship
Former castles in Poland
History of Prudnik
Buildings and structures in Prudnik